The Haiti Davis Cup team represents Haiti in Davis Cup tennis competition and are governed by the Fédération Haïtienne de Tennis. They have not competed since 2013.

Haiti currently compete in the Americas Zone of Group III. They reached the Group II semifinals twice in 1990 and 1998.

History
Haiti competed in its first Davis Cup in 1988.

Current team (2022) 

 Christopher Bogelin
 James Adler Germinal
 Junior Bazanne
 Walton Louis

See also
 Davis Cup
 Haiti Fed Cup team

External links

Davis Cup teams
Davis Cup
Davis Cup